Pietro Brollo (1 December 1933 – 5 December 2019) was an Italian Roman Catholic bishop.

Brollo was born in Italy and was ordained to the priesthood in 1957. He served as titular bishop of Zuglio and auxiliary bishop of the Roman Catholic Archdiocese of Udine, Italy, from 1985 to 1995. He then served as bishop of the Roman Catholic Diocese of Belluno-Feltre, Italy, from 1995 to 2000. Brollo served as archbishop of the Udine Archdiocese from 2000 to 2009.

Notes

External links

1933 births
2019 deaths
Italian Roman Catholic archbishops